Place du Bourg-de-Four is a city square in the Old Town of Geneva, Switzerland. It is a commercial center, with fountains, restaurants (with outdoor seating), gelaterias, and high-end shopping. The Place is also near Geneva's largest church, St. Pierre Cathedral.

Squares in Switzerland
Geography of Geneva
Tourist attractions in Geneva